Erich Kästner may refer to:

Erich Kästner (1899–1974), German author
Erich Kästner (camera designer) (1911–2005), German camera engineer
Erich Kästner (World War I veteran) (1900–2008), last German veteran to serve in World War I